Melinești is a commune in Dolj County, Oltenia, Romania with a population of 4,392 people. It is composed of thirteen villages: Bodăiești, Bodăieștii de Sus, Godeni, Melinești, Muierușu, Negoiești, Odoleni, Ohaba, Ploștina, Popești, Spineni, Valea Mare and Valea Muierii de Jos.

References

Communes in Dolj County
Localities in Oltenia